Russell William Volckmann (October 23, 1911 – June 30, 1982) was a graduate of the United States Military Academy at West Point, a U.S. Army infantry officer and a leader of the Philippine Commonwealth military and guerrilla resistance to the Japanese conquest of the Philippines during World War II. After the war, he remained in the U.S. Army and helped create the U.S. Army Special Forces. Volckmann, together with Colonels Aaron Bank and Wendell Fertig are considered the founders of the U.S. Army Special Forces (the "Green Berets"). He eventually retired as a brigadier general.

Pre-war
Russell Volckmann was born 23 October 1911, in Clinton, Iowa, to Hattie May (Dodds) and William J. C. Volckmann. He attended high school at Shattuck Military Academy, Fairbault, Minnesota.

In 1930, he entered the United States Military Academy at West Point, New York, and was commissioned a second lieutenant in the infantry upon graduation in June 1934. Although he asked for assignment to the Philippines, a choice duty station requested by many officers, his below average performance at West Point resulted in assignment elsewhere. Volckmann received orders to Fort Snelling, Minnesota, where he was a rifle platoon leader and later a company executive officer with the 3rd Infantry Division. In 1937, he received orders to attend the Infantry Officer Advanced Course at Fort Benning, Georgia. After completing this school, he served at Fort Sam Houston, Texas, as a company commander with the 2nd Infantry Division. In 1940, he finally received orders for duty in the Philippines.

In the summer of 1940, 29-year-old Captain Volckmann loaded himself, his wife Nancy and their young son aboard a ship for duty in the Far East. Upon arrival in the Philippines, he became the commander of Company H, 31st Infantry Regiment.  In July 1941, he was transferred to the 11th Infantry Regiment, 11th Infantry Division, Philippine Army, as the regimental executive officer. This was unusual duty for a company-grade officer, but political tensions in the Pacific resulted in accelerated expansion and training for the Philippine Commonwealth Army.

In August 1941, Volckmann's wife and son, along with all other U.S. military dependents, were sent back to the United States due to war concerns. On 8 December 1941, the Japanese attacked the Philippines.

World War II
The 11th fought a delaying retreat from Lingayen Gulf to Bataan.  At the fall of Bataan in 1942, Volckmann refused to surrender and, accompanied by Donald Blackburn, began a trek to northern Luzon before the fall of Corregidor. Sometimes in the company of other fleeing American and Filipino soldiers, Volckmann and Blackburn headed to the cordillera in Northern Luzon. Once there, they hoped to assist in establishing an organized resistance against the Japanese. Volckmann strongly credits the assistance of Filipino civilians in making their journey a success, especially during their periods of illness, and time recovering at the American Fassoth Camp. On 20 August 1942, they reached Colonel Thorp's camp west of Fort Stotsenburg in the Zambales Mountains. Thorp had been sent out from Bataan in January to organize guerrillas. On 24 August, they were guided to Hukbalahap headquarters on Mount Arayat, which then had them guided north to La Paz, Tarlac.  They made their way north to Robert Lapham's camp, who then guided them further north to Charlie Cushing's camp, where Herb Swick joined them. On 9 September, they met Colonels Noble and Moses, Captain Parker Calvert, and Lieutenant Arthur P. Murphy in North Luzon.

Colonel Moses assumed command of guerrilla forces in North Luzon on 1 October 1942, and ordered coordinated attacks on Japanese forces starting on 15 October. Volckmann and Backburn joined Lieutenant Rufino Baldwin, Philippine Army, in attacks on the Japanese garrisons in the Sanhiglo and Balatoc area. Volckmann then established a new camp in Kiangan, Ifugao on 8 December 1942. After being notified on 9 June 1943 of the capture of Colonels Moses and Noble, Volckmann took command of the two thousand man strong USAFIP-NL. His orders from Douglas MacArthur's SWPA, were to "...limit hostilities and contact with the enemy to the minimum...your present mission as intelligence units can be of utmost value".

On 24 November 1943, Volckmann organized his army into seven districts: 1st District under Major Parker Calvert, 2nd and 3rd Districts under Major George Barnett, 4th District under Major Ralph Praeger, 5th District under Major Romulo Manriquez, 6th District under Major Robert Lapham, and the 7th District under Volckmann and Blackburn. Volckmann's claim to command some of these units is questionable. For example, Robert Lapham rejected Volckmann's efforts to command his guerrilla group. In early 1944, Volckmann established USAFIP-NL headquarters in western Benguet, and in August 1944, received a radio set allowing direct contact with SWPA for the first time since March 1943. On 30 October 1944, Volckmann's forces rescued Mrs. Osmena and family from Baguio.  In November, Volckmann's forces were first supplied by submarine, the USS Gar.

After the start of the Battle of Leyte, Volckmann's forces eliminated those Philippine Constabulary units created by the Japanese who did not surrender.  Volckmann organized the Commonwealth military and guerrilla resistance among the Ifugao's 11th Infantry Battalion; they were led by 1st Lieutenants: Francisco Balanban, Alpha Company; Guinid Tuguinay, Bravo Company; Pedro Dulnuan Sr., Administration. Volckmann's forces operated in the western and northern coasts of Luzon, launching attacks against the Japanese occupiers. During the U.S. and Filipino invasion of the Philippines in January 1945, Volckmann's guerrillas cut key communication lines, bridges, and isolated enemy barracks. Once the invasion forces had landed, he led attacks against the retreating Japanese forces far behind the lines, capturing bases and air fields, thereby allowing the American advance to proceed at a much quicker pace.

Volckmann's guerrillas numbered about 8,000 men at the start of the Battle of Luzon, but grew to 18,000 when supplied by the Sixth United States Army. They consisted of five infantry regiments: the 11th, 14th, 15th, 66th, and the 121st, with Volckmann as the Commander, United States Armed Forces in the Philippines—Northern Luzon or USAFIP-NL (Military and Guerrillas).  His force played an instrumental role in the Battle of Bacsil Ridge, Battle of Bessang Pass, and Battle of Mayoyao Ridge.

Post-World War II

During December 1945, Colonel Volckmann briefly returned to the United States to reunite with his family. After two months of leave and medical treatment due to his exposure to various diseases in the Philippines, he returned to the Philippines to assist in unfinished business related to his command as the guerrilla leader of North Luzon. This included investigation of war crimes, payments to civilians of vouchers issued during the war, and confirmation of pay to local soldiers and guerrilla fighters. He did not return again to the United States until July 1946. Due to his illnesses and the stress of continual combat, Volckmann would not be released as a medical patient until early 1948.

After his official release as a patient, General Dwight D. Eisenhower, now Army Chief of Staff, ordered Volckmann to write what would become the Army's first official counterinsurgency doctrine. During 1948–1949, Volckmann was busy writing this new technical manual,  based on his experiences in the Philippines. In September 1950, FM 31-20 Operations Against Guerrilla Forces was released. This was just in time, as the Korean War began when South Korea was invaded by the North Koreans in June 1950. The North Koreans made extensive use of guerrillas and regular U.S. Army doctrine was ineffective against them. General MacArthur requested that Colonel Volckmann be immediately assigned to Eighth Army Headquarters, and he appointed Volckmann as Executive Office of the Special Activities Group (SAG)-Far East Command, a combination of U.S. Army Rangers, U.S. Marines and South Korean troops. The unit was commanded by Colonel Louis B. Ely, a veteran of the OSS. As executive officer, Volvkmann's duties were to plan and conduct guerrilla activities behind North Korean lines. Less than six months into this new position, Volckmann was evacuated to the United States due to a relapse of a medical condition, most likely a severe stomach ulcer, he had incurred in the Philippines.

Upon his return, Volckmann began a new writing assignment, and, in 1951,  FM 31-21 Organization and Conduct of Guerrilla Warfare was released. Brigadier General Robert A. McClure, director of the Office of the Chief of Psychological Warfare (OCPW), asked Volckmann to become OCPW's Chief of Plans—Special Operations Division. Joining Volckman were Colonel Aaron Bank, a former OSS operative who served with the Jedburghs in Europe; Colonel Wendell Fertig, another major leader of guerrilla resistance in the Philippines; and Colonel Melvin Blair, a veteran of "Merrill's Marauders".

After attending the National War College, in Washington, D.C., during 1953–1954, Volckmann served as Chief of Special Operations Division, U.S. European Command, from 1954–1956.

In 1956, Volckmann completed the Basic Airborne Course at Fort Benning, Georgia. At that time, he was 45 years old and one of the oldest soldiers to take and complete that course. The course was required since he then served as assistant division commander, 82nd Airborne Division, at Fort Bragg, North Carolina, during 1956–1957.

Due to his service with irregular troops in the Philippines and loss of contact with the U.S. Army, Volckmann's promotions were also irregular. Promoted to major on 31 January 1942, months before his escape to North Luzon, he then received temporary promotion to lieutenant colonel on 20 November 1944, and a temporary promotion to colonel on 21 January 1945. However, he reverted to permanent lieutenant colonel on 1 August 1946, and then to permanent colonel again on 1 February 1953. He received his final promotion to brigadier general on 31 December 1956.

In July 1957, Volckmann retired from the Army after 27 years of military service, including his four years as a cadet at West Point.

The Special Forces Association lists Volckmann one of three men who "used their wartime experience to formulate the doctrine of unconventional warfare that became the cornerstone of SF [Special Forces]," Bank often receives credit for being the true founder, but this is because he created the Table of Organization for the Special Forces and commanded the first units.  In a letter dated 23 February 1969, Bank gives credit to Volckmann for "the development of position, planning and policy papers that helped see the establishment of Special Forces units in the active Army". Volckmann and Fertig both commanded corps-sized guerrilla units in World War II and organized them from the ground up. They had developed the doctrine of U.S. military guerrilla insurgency that guides the Special Forces today.

Later life
After retiring from the U.S. Army, Volckmann was president of Volckmann Furniture Manufacturing Company in Morrison, Illinois. He was also president of Zeffyr Industries and president of Volckmann Division of Ethan Allen Inc., from 1970 until his retirement in 1977.

Volckmann remained active in military matters following his retirement. For example, in 1962, he was asked by the U.S. Air Force to lead a Rand Corporation study panel on the feasibility of air support in counterinsurgency operations.

Russell Volckmann died on 30 June 1982. Attending his funeral were several officials representing the Philippine government: Brigadier General Angel G. Kanapi, defense attache of the Philippine Embassy in Washington, D.C.;  Mr. Nick Nor Paynor Jr., aide to General Kanapi; and Mr. Esperanto Curaming, representing the Philippine Consul General of Chicago. Also in attendance was his old comrade, Brigadier General Donald Blackburn, who was then living in McLean, Virginian. Volckmann is buried in Springdale Cemetery at Clinton, Iowa.

Family
After graduating from West Point, Volckmann married Nancy Sorley in 1934. In 1936, a son, Russell Jr., was born. Although both accompanied him to the Philippines in 1940, they were forced to return to the United States with other military dependents in August 1941. In March 1942, his wife received a letter from him before the surrender of Bataan, It would be the last his family would hear from him until January 1945.

Upon Volckmann's second return to the United States in July 1946, his wife Nancy requested a divorce, which was finalized in August 1947.

On 28 August 1948, he married Helen Rich, and they had two sons, William (b. 1954) and Edward (b. 1961). They remained married until Volckmann's death in 1982.

Awards and decorations
His decorations include:

See also
List of American guerrillas in the Philippines
Donald Blackburn

References

Sources

External links

1911 births
1982 deaths
People from Clinton, Iowa
Military personnel from Iowa
United States Military Academy alumni
United States Army officers
United States Army personnel of World War II
American guerrillas of World War II
Recipients of the Distinguished Service Cross (United States)
Recipients of the Distinguished Service Medal (US Army)
Recipients of the Silver Star
Recipients of the Legion of Merit
Members of the United States Army Special Forces
National War College alumni
Philippine resistance against Japan